Weightlifting was contested by men at the 2005 West Asian Games in Doha, Qatar from December 2 to December 4, 2005. All competition took place at the Al-Sadd Indoor Hall.

The host nation Qatar topped the medal table with three gold medals by three naturalized Bulgarian weightlifters.

Medalists

Medal table

References

Results

External links
 Official Website

2005 West Asian Games
West Asian Games
2005 West Asian Games